John Zenon Jasinski (July 17, 1887 - April 28, 1951) was a bishop of the Polish National Catholic Church.

Biography
He was born on July 17, 1887, in Poland. He was consecrated on June 7, 1928, in Scranton, Pennsylvania by Franciszek Hodur with the assistance of Bishop Leon Grochowski and Bishop Valentine Gawrychowski. He died on April 28, 1951.

References
 Apostolic Succession in the PNCC
 John Zenon Jasinski, Apostolic Succession in the Polish National Catholic Church (Scranton: no publisher, no date).

American bishops
American Old Catholics
Bishops of the Polish National Catholic Church
1887 births
1951 deaths
Polish emigrants to the United States